Long Hot Summer may refer to:

Film and television 
The Long, Hot Summer, a 1958 film starring Paul Newman
The Long, Hot Summer (TV series), a 1965 to 1966 television series
The Long Hot Summer (1985 film), a television film starring Don Johnson
A Long Hot Summer (film), a 1999 Finnish film

Music 
 "Long Hot Summer" (Tom Robinson song), 1978
"Long Hot Summer" (The Style Council song), 1983
"Long Hot Summer" (Girls Aloud song), 2005
"Long Hot Summer" (Keith Urban song), 2011
A Long Hot Summer, a 2004 album by Masta Ace

Other 
 Long, hot summer of 1967, in which multiple race riots occurred during the American Civil Rights Movement
Long Hot Summer, a 2012 Image Comics publication

See also
"Long Hot Summer Night", a 1968 song by The Jimi Hendrix Experience from Electric Ladyland